Klindt is a surname. Notable people with the surname include:

Anna Klindt Sørensen (1899–1985), Danish painter and illustrator
David Klindt (born 1950), American politician
Nicolai Klindt (born 1988), Danish motorcycle speedway rider